Richard Thomas Mazza (born September 4, 1939) is an American businessman and politician from Vermont.  A Democrat, he has served as a member of the Vermont Senate since 1985, making him the body's dean, or longest-serving member.  Mazza represents the Chittenden-Grand Isle district, which includes the town of Colchester in Chittenden County and all of Grand Isle County.

Biography
Mazza was born in on September 4, 1939, and is a lifelong resident of Colchester.  He was educated in the public schools of Colchester and graduated from Winooski High School.

Mazza is the owner and operator of Dick Mazza's General Store in Colchester.  His civic memberships have included member of the Champlain Valley Fair board of directors and president of the Colchester Senior Citizens Housing Project.  Mazza served in the Vermont House of Representatives from 1973 to 1977 and was a member of the Transportation Committee and the Legislative Council Committee.

In 1984, Mazza was elected to the Vermont Senate and he has served continuously since taking his seat in 1985.  Since 1991 he has served on the Transportation Committee, including terms as chairman.  He has also served on the Institutions Committee since 1991, including terms as vice chairman.

Mazza has been a member of the legislature's Joint Transportation Oversight Committee, including terms as chairman.  Since 1997 he has been the third member of the Senate's Committee on Committees.  The Committee on Committees included the lieutenant governor, the senate president, and a third member chosen by the full senate.  The Committee on Committees makes committee assignments, and assigns chairpersons, vice chairpersons, and committee clerks.

Mazza is married to the former Dorothy D. Hinds.  They are the parents of one son and one daughter, and the grandparents of four.

References

1939 births
Living people
21st-century American politicians
Democratic Party members of the Vermont House of Representatives
Democratic Party Vermont state senators
People from Colchester, Vermont